A range of events occur in Tasmania, from well known sporting fixtures such as Sydney to Hobart, to arts festivals such as 10 Days on the Island. This is a list
of those that are notable.

List of annual events and festivals in Tasmania

Past events (no longer held) 
Gone South Music festival held at Launceston
MS Fest Charity music event held in Launceston to raise money for people with multiple sclerosis
Southern Roots Festival Music festival

See also

Sport in Tasmania
Festivals of Australia

References

 
Culture of Tasmania
Tasmania
Tasmania
Tasmania,Events
Lists of tourist attractions in Tasmania